Athuman Idd Chuji is a Tanzanian footballer who plays Singida united club and international football for Tanzania.currently he is no longer playing for young African side.

References

1988 births
Living people
Tanzanian footballers
Tanzania international footballers
Young Africans S.C. players
Association footballers not categorized by position
Tanzanian Premier League players
2009 African Nations Championship players
Tanzania A' international footballers